North West (formerly Western Transvaal) plays first-class cricket in South Africa. For the purposes of the SuperSport Series, North West has merged with Gauteng (formerly Transvaal) to form the Highveld Lions or, more simply, "the Lions".

North West was called Western Transvaal in 1989–90 when it began playing List A cricket in the Nissan Shield, and in 1991–92 when it began playing in the second tier of the South African first-class cricket competition. It changed its name to North West in 1996, after the creation of North West province from parts of the former Transvaal Province and Cape Province. It has been part of the Lions since October 2004.

Under the name Western Transvaal it won no matches at all in its five first-class seasons. In its first season as North West it had its first first-class victory when it beat Western Province B by 27 runs in January 1997.

In April 2017 the province's administration, North West Cricket, re-branded all the province's teams as the "North-West Dragons".

During the 2018 Africa T20 Cup, North West scored 262 runs against Limpopo, recording the second-highest total in T20 cricket.

Honours
 Currie Cup (0) –  ; shared (0) – 
 Standard Bank Cup (0) – 
 South African Airways Provincial Three-Day Challenge (0) – 
 South African Airways Provincial One-Day Challenge (0) – 
 Gillette/Nissan Cup –

Venues
Venues have included:
 Witrand Cricket Field, Potchefstroom (Nov 1991 – Dec 1996)
 Fanie du Toit Sports Complex, Potchefstroom (Nov 1994 – March 1998)
 Gert Van Rensburg Stadium, Fochville (Dec 1997 – Feb 1999)
 North West Cricket Stadium aka Sedgars Park, Potchefstroom (main venue Oct 1999–present)

Squad
In April 2021, Cricket South Africa confirmed the following squad ahead of the 2021–22 season.

 Delano Potgieter
 Lesego Senokwane
 Nicky van den Bergh
 Senuran Muthusamy
 Nono Pongolo
 Eldred Hawken
 Heino Kuhn
 Lwandiswa Zuma
 Shaylen Pillay
 Wesley Marshall
 Ndumiso Mvelase
 Eben Botha
 Johannes Diseko
 Duan Jansen
 Chad Classen
 Jason Oakes
 Dwaine Pretorius

References

Sources
 South African Cricket Annual – various editions
 Wisden Cricketers' Almanack – various editions

External links
 North West's page at Cricket South Africa
 North West at CricketArchive
 Western Transvaal at CricketArchive

Cricket in North West (South African province)
Highveld Lions
South African first-class cricket teams